Persicobacter psychrovividus is a Gram-negative, facultatively anaerobic and motile bacterium from the genus of Porifericola which has been isolated from shellfish in Japan.

References

External links
Type strain of Persicobacter psychrovividus at BacDive -  the Bacterial Diversity Metadatabase

Further reading 
 

Cytophagia
Bacteria described in 2010